Clifford Sibusiso Mamba (born 5 May 1963, in Manzini) is a Swazi diplomat and former Olympic athlete. Mamba competed for Swaziland at the 1984 Summer Olympics in the 100m and 200 m races.

Education
Mamba earned a B.S. at Middlesex University in the United Kingdom.

Diplomacy
Following his education, Mamba became the ambassador to the European Union from 1991 to 1996. After leaving the European Union, Mamba became the ambassador to the Republic of Korea and Asia including a co-accreditation to Brunei, Japan, Singapore and Taiwan. From 2002 to 2005, Mamba was the ambassador to the United Nations from Swaziland.

References

External links
 Biography African People Database

1963 births
Living people
Swazi diplomats
People from Manzini
Swazi male sprinters
Olympic athletes of Eswatini
Commonwealth Games competitors for Eswatini
Athletes (track and field) at the 1982 Commonwealth Games
Athletes (track and field) at the 1984 Summer Olympics
Athletes (track and field) at the 1986 Commonwealth Games
Alumni of Middlesex University
Permanent Representatives of Eswatini to the United Nations
Ambassadors of Eswatini to South Korea
Ambassadors of Eswatini to the European Union
Members of Thames Valley Harriers